Isabelle Mihail (born 8 February 1999) is a Romanian footballer who plays as a forward and has appeared for the Romania women's national team.

Career
Mihail has been capped for the Romania national team, appearing for the team during the 2019 FIFA Women's World Cup qualifying cycle.

References

External links
 
 
 

1999 births
Living people
Romanian women's footballers
Romania women's international footballers
Women's association football forwards
FCU Olimpia Cluj players